Yurun (Mandarin: 雨润镇) is a town in Ledu District, Haidong, Qinghai, China. In 2010, Yurun had a total population of 14,515: 7,335 males and 7,180 females: 2,498 aged under 14, 10,877 aged between 15 and 65 and 1,140 aged over 65.

References 
 

Township-level divisions of Qinghai
Haidong
Towns in China